The Hon. Charles L. Brieant Jr. Federal Building and Courthouse is a United States federal office building and courthouse located at 300 Quarropas Street in downtown White Plains, New York, the seat of Westchester County. It is adjacent to the Richard J. Daronco Courthouse in which the New York State Supreme Court and Westchester County Court sit.

The United States District Court for the Southern District of New York hears cases in the courthouse. It is named for Charles L. Brieant Jr., a former federal judge at the White Plains courthouse who also practiced law and was involved in politics in Westchester County.

See also 
 List of United States federal courthouses in New York

References 

Federal buildings in the United States
Courthouses in New York (state)
Federal courthouses in the United States
Buildings and structures in White Plains, New York